Bubaque Airport  is an airport serving the island town of Bubaque, in Guinea-Bissau. It is the Bijagos Archipelago's only airfield.

The airport is on the north end of the island. North approach and departure will be over the water. The  runway is unpaved.

See also 
Transport in Guinea-Bissau
List of airports in Guinea-Bissau

References

External links
OpenStreetMap - Bubaque
OurAirports - Bubaque Airport

Airports in Guinea-Bissau
Bolama Region